The 1987 Nobel Prize in Literature was awarded to the Russian–American poet and essayist Joseph Brodsky (1940–1996) "for an all-embracing authorship, imbued with clarity of thought and poetic intensity."

Laureate

At the age of 18, Joseph Brodsky started writing poetry. His poetry was influenced by British poets like John Donne and W. H. Auden as well as Russian predecessors like Alexander Pushkin and Boris Pasternak. Brodsky's forced exile affected his writing, both thematically and linguistically. He details how he gradually loses hair, teeth, consonants, and verbs in Chast' rechi ("A Part of Speech", 1977). The interaction between the poet and society appears frequently in his poems. According to Brodsky, literature and language are vital tools for the advancement of society and the advancement of human thought. His famous literary and autobiographical essay collection Less Than One: Selected Essays (1986) explores his fellow Russian writers like Dostoyevsky, Mandelstam, and Platonov.

References

External links
1987 Press release nobelprize.org
Award ceremony speech nobelprize.org

1987
Joseph Brodsky